Lucia Faria (born 11 November 1945) is a Brazilian equestrian. She competed in two events at the 1968 Summer Olympics.

References

1945 births
Living people
Brazilian female equestrians
Olympic equestrians of Brazil
Equestrians at the 1968 Summer Olympics
Sportspeople from Rio de Janeiro (city)